The 2014–15 Football Conference season is the eleventh season with the Football Conference consisting of three divisions and the thirty-fifth season overall. The Conference covers the top two levels of non-League football in England. The Conference Premier is the fifth highest level of the overall pyramid, whilst the Conference North and Conference South exist at the sixth level. The top team and the winner of the play-off of the Premier division will be promoted to League Two, while the bottom four are relegated to the North or South divisions. The champions of the North and South divisions will be promoted to the Premier division, alongside the play-off winners from each division. The bottom three in each of the North and South divisions are relegated to the premier divisions of the Northern Premier League, Isthmian League or Southern League.

Barnet returned the Football League as champions after two seasons in the Conference, while playoff winners Bristol Rovers returned after a single season, their only season outside the Football League since being admitted in 1920.

Conference Premier

Promotion and relegation
Teams promoted from 2013–14 Conference North
 AFC Telford United (League Champions)
 Altrincham (Play-off Winners)

Teams promoted from 2013–14 Conference South
 Eastleigh (League Champions)
 Dover Athletic (Play-off Winners)

Teams relegated from 2013–14 League Two
 Bristol Rovers 
 Torquay United

Expelled from Conference Premier
 Hereford United
 Salisbury City

League table

Play-offs

First leg

Second leg

Final

Results

Stadia and locations

Top scorers

Conference North

Promotion and relegation
Teams promoted from 2013–14 Northern Premier League Premier Division
Chorley (League Champions)
AFC Fylde (Play-off Winners)
Teams promoted from 2013–14 Isthmian League Premier Division
Lowestoft Town (Play-off Winners)
Teams relegated from 2013–14 Conference Premier
Tamworth 
Hyde

League table

Play-offs

First leg

Second leg

Final

Results

Stadia and locations

Top scorers

Conference South

Promotion and relegation
Teams promoted from 2013–14 Isthmian League Premier Division
Wealdstone (League Champions)
Teams promoted from 2013–14 Southern League Premier Division
Hemel Hempstead Town (League Champions)
St Albans City (Play-off Winners)

The division ran one club short due to the expulsion of Salisbury City.

League table

Play-offs

First leg

Second leg

Final

Results

Stadia and locations

Top scorers

References

 
National League (English football) seasons
5
Eng